Robert Chesney may refer to:
Robert M. Chesney, counter-terrorism expert and law professor at The University of Texas School of Law
Robert de Chesney, 12th-century Bishop of Lincoln